Robert John Boldon (born May 1, 1975) is an American women's basketball coach and former basketball player. He is the current head women's basketball coach at Ohio University.  He previously held the same position at Youngstown State University, Lambuth, and Arkansas-Monticello

Playing career
Boldon started at point guard for four years and led Walsh to the NAIA Final Four in 1995–96. As a freshman, Boldon averaged 8.2 points and accumulated 163 assists.  Over the next three years, Boldon was named First Team All-Mid-Ohio Conference each season, accumulating 204 assists and an average of 12.7 points as a sophomore, 222 assists and an average of 14.5 points as a junior, and 186 assists and an average of 14.3 points as a senior.  During his junior season, Boldon led his team to the Mid-Ohio Conference championship and was named the MOC Player of the Year, first team NAIA All-American, and Mr. Hustle at the NAIA National Tournament.  He was named NAIA Second Team All-American following his senior season.  He is still Walsh's career assist leader with 775 and is fourth in career points with 1,694. In 2008 he was inducted into the Walsh Althetics Wall of Fame.

Education and personal life
Boldon, a native of Louisville, Ohio, graduated from Walsh University in 1997 with a bachelor's degree in elementary education. He earned his master's degree in liberal studies from Indiana in 2003. Boldon is married and has four sons.

Coaching career

He began his head coaching career at University of Arkansas at Monticello in the 2004–05 season and also served as the head coach of the women's basketball team at Lambuth University in 2008–09.  Boldon also served as an assistant coach at Walsh, Wilmington, IPFW, Gannon, Texas A&M-Corpus Christi, Akron, and Florida Gulf Coast University.

Youngstown State

Boldon led Youngstown State to its biggest win increase ever under a first-year head coach in the 2010–11 campaign.  Overall, the Penguins went 6–24 for the campaign for a six-win improvement from the previous year. In 2010, he led the Penguins their first victory in nearly two years. In his third year the Penguins won 23 games and finished second in the Horizon League.  They qualified for the 2013 WNIT.

Ohio

He was announced as Ohio's head coach on March 28, 2013. He won MAC championships during his 2nd and 3rd seasons at Ohio. They won the 2015 MAC tournament and played in the NCAA tournament where they lost to Arizona State. He was named 2015 MAC Coach of the year. During the 2018–19 season his team won a school record 30 games and he became the leader in coaching wins in program history. Ohio played in the WNIT in 2016, 2017, 2019, 2021, and 2022.

Head coaching record

* MAC tournament had to stop due to COVID-19 pandemic.
** Boldon missed one conference game due to a positive Covid-19 test. The team lost the game and the loss doesn’t count towards his record.

References

External links
Ohio Bobcats coaching bio

1975 births
Living people
Akron Zips women's basketball coaches
American women's basketball coaches
Basketball coaches from Ohio
Ohio Bobcats women's basketball coaches
People from Louisville, Ohio
Place of birth missing (living people)
Walsh Cavaliers men's basketball players
Youngstown State Penguins women's basketball coaches
American men's basketball players
Point guards